Mahilpur is a city and a Nagar Panchayat in Hoshiarpur district in the Indian state Punjab.  It is situated on Hoshiarpur to Garhshankar stretch of State Highway 24. It is famous for the game of football in the region. Mahilpur is connected by road to nearby districts, states such as Jaijon, Jalandhar, Pathankot, Mohali, Chandigarh. Mahilpur is a development block. Mahilpur block has 140 villages in it. It as also known as the soccer-town of India given the craze of football among the people of Mahilpur town and its surrounding villages. It belongs to the Kandi area in the Doaba region of Punjab.

Demographics
Mahilpur had a population of 11360 according to census of 2011. Males constitute 52% of the population and females 48%. Mahilpur has an average literacy rate of 77%, higher than the national average of 59.5%: male literacy is 80%, and female literacy is 73%. In Mahilpur, 10% of the population is under 6 years of age. Profession of the most of the persons are agriculture based. Mahilpur is the NRI hub of the Punjab state.

Notable people
 Buckam Singh Bains, (5 December 1893 – 27 August 1919), World War I Canadian Sikh war veteran (Private 454819, 28th Battalion, Canadian Expeditionary Force)
Sohan Singh Thandal, Chief Parliamentary Secretary, State Government of Punjab
Piara Singh Gill, Indian nuclear physicist
Harjit Singh Sajjan (Punjabi: ਹਰਜੀਤ ਸਿੰਘ ਸੱਜਣ), Canadian Liberal Member of Parliament and Minister of National Defence, 
Kulwinder Dhillon (Punjabi: ਕੁਲਵਿੰਦਰ ਢਿੱਲੋਂ). famous Punjabi singer from nearby village Pandori Ladha Singh.
Manmohan Waris, famous Punjabi Singer from nearby village Halluwal.
Kamal Heer, famous Punjabi Singer, brother of Manmohan Waris from nearby village Halluwal.
Satinder Sartaaj, from a nearby village Bajrawar.
Baljit Sahni, Indian football player.
Harmanjot Khabra, Indian football player.
Jarnail Singh Dhillon, Arjuna awardee Indian football player.
Gurdev Singh Gill, Arjuna awardee football player.
Balwant Singh (footballer), Indian Professional footballer.

Schools and colleges
 St. Soldier Divine Public school Mahilpur (CBSE Affiliated School)
Doaba Public School, Mahilpur (CBSE Affiliated School)
Sant Baba Hari Singh Model School, (ICSE Affiliated)
S. Baldev Singh Mahilpuri Govt. Sr. Secondary School, Mahilpur (Boys)
 Govt, Sr Secondary School, Mahilpur (Girls)
 S.G.G.S. Khalsa College, Mahilpur
 Guru Nanak National Public Senior Secondary School, Mahilpur
 K.D.International School, Mahilpur (CBSE Affliliated School)
 King Edward Public School, Mahilpur
 K.D College of Nursing, Mahilpur
 Alice High School Mahilpur
 Ankur Public School, Mahilpur
 Adarsh Model School
 Guru Gobind Singh College of Management and Information Technology
Bite Educational Institute
Sai College of Nursing, Sardullapur near Mahilpur
S.G.G.S. School, Paradasi School in Mahilpur

History
Mahilpur was part of the Indus Valley civilisation, although it was founded probably during the Vedic period. Chinese pilgrim Huang Tsang visited it in 635 when he was going to Chamba valley from Jalandhar and described it as Sri Mahipalpur in his travel accounts. Many nearby villages have been found to be part of the Indus Valley Civilization. Mahilpur was one of the earlier centers of educational institutions being set up during the time of the British Raj. Its government boys school, formerly known as Khalsa High School, was established in 1909. Khalsa College was established in 1946. Mahilpur had its first bank as Punjab National Bank in 1946 which operates two branches in the city. Mahilpur is famous for mangoes in the region.

See also
Mukhomazara
Dandiyan
Kalewal Fattu

References

Cities and towns in Hoshiarpur district